Acres of Books was a large independent bookstore in downtown Long Beach, California.

Background 

The business was founded in Cincinnati, Ohio, in 1927 by Bertrand Smith.  In 1934 Smith moved to California and established the store in Long Beach; he moved to the current address at 240 Long Beach Boulevard in 1960.  Acres of Books was the largest and oldest family-owned second-hand bookstore in California, claiming to have in stock over one million books.

In 1959 Smith gave to the people of Long Beach a collection of rare books, some dating back to the 15th century. Included in the collection is a two volume facsimile of the Gutenberg Bible, all of which is housed as part of the Loraine and Earl Burns Miller Special Collections Room at the main branch of the Long Beach public library.

In 1990 Acres of Books was designated a cultural heritage landmark by the City of Long Beach.

In its long history Acres of Books served clientele such as Jack Vance, Upton Sinclair, Stan Freberg, Gary Owens, James Hilton, Greg Bear, Tim Powers, Thurston Moore, Mike Watt, Paul Schrader, Fran Lebowitz, Robert Easton, Eli Wallach, Diane Keaton, Larry McMurtry, and, most notably, Ray Bradbury, who immortalized the bookstore in an essay entitled "I Sing the Bookstore Eclectic".

Acres of Books closed on October 18, 2008. The owners have sold the  lot the store is located on to the Long Beach Redevelopment Agency for $2.8 million. Subsequently, the Redevelopment Agency was dissolved by order of Governor Jerry Brown.

The site was proposed to be developed as an art exchange, but the project seems to be moribund.

The bookstore appeared in the film The Jane Austen Book Club

See also
 List of City of Long Beach Historic Landmarks

References 

Bookstores in California
Independent bookstores of the United States
Buildings and structures in Long Beach, California
Retail buildings in California
Companies based in Long Beach, California
American companies established in 1927
Bookstores established in the 20th century
Retail companies established in 1927
Retail companies disestablished in 2008
1927 establishments in Ohio
2008 disestablishments in California
Defunct companies based in Greater Los Angeles
Landmarks in Long Beach, California